Events in the year 1990 in Norway.

Incumbents 
 Monarch: Olav V
 Regent: Harald – latter half of the year
 Prime Minister: Jan P. Syse (Conservative Party) until 3 November, Gro Harlem Brundtland (Labour Party)

Events 

 1 January – The Confederation of Norwegian Enterprise is founded as a merger of the Federation of Norwegian Industries, the Norwegian Employers' Confederation and the Federation of Norwegian Craftsmen.
 8 April – Passenger Ferry MS Scandinavian Star catches fire en route from Norway to Denmark. 159 people are killed in the event.
 15 April – Miss Norway Mona Grudt is crowned Miss Universe in Los Angeles, USA.
 3 November –
 Gro Harlem Brundtland becomes Prime Minister of Norway for the third time
 Brundtland's Third Cabinet was appointed.
 Population Census: 4,247,546 inhabitants in Norway.
 Flekkefjord Line railway line closes (opened in 1904).

Popular culture

Sports

Music

Film

Literature

Notable births

January 
 
4 January – Pål André Helland, footballer
5 January – Ole Amund Sveen, footballer
6 January – Kristian Opseth, footballer 
10 January – Amin Nouri, footballer
12 January – Sabri Khattab, footballer
29 January – Ingrid Moe Wold, footballer

February 
 
2 February – Patrik Svendsen, musician
3 February – Michael Karlsen, footballer 
14 February – 
 Kjetil Borch, rower.
 Adama Diomande, footballer 
15 February – 
 Fredrik Lystad Jacobsen, ice hockey player
 Anders Karlsen, footballer
22 February – Didrik Bastian Juell, freestyle skier.
27 February – Line Kloster, sprinter.

March 
  

1 March – Edwin Kjeldner, footballer
6 March – Linn Haug, snowboarder
9 March – Bendik Bye, footballer
13 March – Hedda Hynne, middle-distance runner
14 March – 
 Vegar Gjermundstad, footballer 
 Christian Grøvlen, classical pianist
15 March – 
 Julie Jensen, freestyle skier
 Mads Stokkelien, footballer
17 March – Anders Kristiansen, footballer
20 March – Christine Spiten, engineer 
25 March – Alexandra Joner, singer and dancer
31 March – Morten Sundli, footballer

April 
  

4 April – Ine Karlsen Stangvik, handball player 
16 April – 
 Linnéa Myhre, author and blogger 
18 April – Lars Stubhaug, footballer
19 April – 
 Espen Lysdahl, alpine skier
 Tomas Northug, cross-country skier
 Eirik Ulltang, trials rider
22 April – Håvard Haukenes, racewalker.

May 
8 May – Ingebjørg Bratland, folk ainger
9 May – Hanne Leland, electro-pop artist and songwriter
24 May – Sofie Marhaug, politician.

June 
   
  

2 June – Jon Ludvig Hammer, chess player
4 June – Gøran Sørheim, handball player
8 June – Marcus Pedersen, footballer 
13 June – Kristian Brix, footballer 
14 June – Karoline Bjerkeli Grøvdal, long-distance runner.
16 June –
 Sanna Solberg, handball player.
 Silje Solberg, handball player.
18 June – Amahl Pellegrino, footballer
19 June – Isak Scheel, footballer
20 June – Iselin Solheim, singer and songwriter 
21 June – 
 Håvard Nordtveit, footballer 
 Lisa Johansen Persheim, handball player
29 June – Thomas Rogne, footballer

July 
  
  

1 July – Endre Kupen, footballer
8 July – Martin Thømt Jensen, footballer
10 July – Veronica Kristiansen, handball player.
11 July – Ole Mofjell, drummer
13 July – Elias Angell Spikseth, cyclist
16 July – Vinjar Slåtten, freestyle skier
18 July – Anders Konradsen, footballer 
21 July – Eirik Valla Dønnem, footballer  
23 July – 
 Dagny Norvoll Sandvik, singer
 Torgeir Standal, jazz guitarist
25 July – Stefan Strandberg, footballer
30 July – Erlend Bjøntegaard, biathlete

August 
  

2 August – Unge Ferrari, musician 
4 August – Simen Raaen Sandmæl, footballer 
5 August – Anna Molberg, politician.
8 August – 
 Magnus Wolff Eikrem, footballer
 Mari Molid, handball player
19 August – Tobias Vibe, footballer 
20 August – 
 Audun Fløtten, cyclist
 Benjamin Stokke, footballer

September 
  
4 September – Remi Johansen, footballer
6 September – Henrik Holm, ice hockey player
10 September – Ørjan Nyland, footballer
11 September – Jo Inge Berget, footballer
14 September – Eivind Henriksen, athlete. 
20 September – Marta Tomac, handball player.

October 
 

2 October – Mix Diskerud, footballer
3 October – Sivert Bjørnstad, politician
11 October – Sandra Márjá West, Sami politician
14 October – Jonas Djupvik Løvlie, ice hockey player 
15 October – Sondre Justad, musician and songwriter
24 October – Hege Hansen, footballer
25 October – Marthe Wang, singer-songwriter

November 
  
  

10 November – Pål Alexander Kirkevold, footballer  
12 November – Harmeet Singh, footballer
14 November – Mathis Bolly, footballer 
27 November – Jonas Rønningen, footballer
29 November – Solfrid Lerbrekk, politician.
30 November – Magnus Carlsen, chess player

December 
7 December – Marte Olsbu Røiseland, biathlete.
10 December – Villiam Strøm, ice hockey player

Full date missing

 Charlotte Dos Santos, jazz singer and composer
 Freddy Kalas, singer
 Bente Landheim, biathlete.

Notable deaths

1 January – Ingvald Bjerke, boxer (b.1907)
2 February – Sigbjørn Bernhoft Osa, folk musician, fiddler (b.1910). 
7 February – Anna Sofie Herland, politician (b.1913)
22 March – Eivind Holmsen, sport shooter (b.1894)
6 April – Carsten Byhring, actor (b.1918)
12 April – Borghild Bondevik Haga, politician (b.1906)
14 April – Alv Kjøs, politician (b.1894)
13 May – Arnljot Karstein Eidnes, politician (b.1909)
13 June – Gidsken Jakobsen, aviation pioneer (b.1908)
27 June – Olav Benum, politician (b.1896)
15 July – Magnus Jensen, historian and educator (born 1902).
19 July – Egil Aarvik, politician (b.1912)
27 July – Rolf Andersen, politician (b.1916)
1 August – Roar Berthelsen, long jumper (b.1934)
25 August – Ingvarda Røberg, politician (b.1895)
26 September – Charles Philipson, judge and civil servant (b. 1928).
10 October – Erling Gjone, architect (born 1898).
12 October – Leif Larsen, naval officer (b.1906)
12 October – Peter Wessel Zapffe, author and philosopher (b.1899)
21 October – Eugen Haugland, triple jumper (b.1912)
29 October – Albert Andreas Mørkved, politician (b.1898)
4 November – Håkon Melberg, linguist (b.1911)
7 November – Sigurd Monssen, rower and Olympic bronze medallist (b.1902)
8 November – Nils Reinhardt Christensen, film director and screenwriter (b.1919)
21 December – Per Høybråten, politician (b.1932)
22 December – Claus Marius Neergaard, politician (b.1911)
24 December – Thorbjørn Egner, playwright, songwriter and illustrator (b.1912)
27 December – Kåre Rønning, politician (b.1929)

Date unknown
 Sigurd Anderson, nineteenth Governor of South Dakota (b.1904)
 Karl Egil Aubert, mathematician (b.1924)
 Per Bergersen, musician (b.1960)
 Leonard Borgzinner, essayist, political philosopher, science fiction author, illustrator and fanzine editor (b.1957
 Arne Dagfin Dahl, military officer (b.1894)
 Inger Koppernæs, politician and Minister (b.1928)
 Odd Kvaal Pedersen, journalist, author and translator (b.1935)
 Niels Werring, shipowner (b.1897)

See also

References

External links